The Caucasian snowcock (Tetraogallus caucasicus) is a snowcock in the pheasant family Phasianidae of the order Galliformes, gallinaceous birds.

It is native to the Caucasus Mountains, particularly the Western Caucasus, where it breeds at altitudes from 2000 to 4000 m on bare stony mountains. It nests in a bare ground scrape and lays typically 5-6 greenish eggs, which are incubated only by the female. Its food is seeds and vegetable matter. It forms small flocks when not breeding.

Description 
Its plumage is patterned with grey, brown, white and black, but this snowcock looks grey from any distance. The breast is darker and the flanks ruddier than the rest of the body. It has a white throat and a white patch on the side of the neck. The nape is rust-coloured.

In flight, this wary bird shows white flight feathers and undertail, and reddish sides to the tail. Male and female plumages are similar, but the juvenile is slightly smaller and duller in appearance.

Caucasian snowcock has a desolate whistling song, vaguely like a Eurasian curlew, . The calls include loud cackles and bubbled .

See also

References

 Pheasants, Partridges and Grouse by Madge and McGowan, 

Caucasian snowcock
Birds of Georgia (country)
Birds of Azerbaijan
Caucasian snowcock